Eternal Domination is the debut album by Greek thrash metal band Suicidal Angels. It was released in 2007 by OSM Records, an independent US label. The album was recorded in Athens at Live Studios. The mix and master procedure took place at Imperial Mastering Studios in San Francisco by American producer Colin Davis.

Track listing
All music and arrangements by Nick and Orfeas; lyrics by Nick except where noted.

Personnel

References 

2007 debut albums